The 1989 European Cup Winners' Cup Final was a football match contested between Barcelona of Spain and Sampdoria of Italy. It was the final match of the 1988–89 European Cup Winners' Cup and the 29th European Cup Winners' Cup final. The final was held at Wankdorf Stadium in Bern, Switzerland, on 10 May 1989. Barcelona won the match 2–0 thanks to goals by Julio Salinas and Luis López Rekarte.

Route to the final

Match

Details

See also
1988–89 European Cup Winners' Cup
1989 European Cup Final
1989 UEFA Cup Final
1992 European Cup Final – contested by the same teams
FC Barcelona in international football competitions
U.C. Sampdoria in European football

References

External links
UEFA Cup Winners' Cup results at Rec.Sport.Soccer Statistics Foundation

3
Cup Winners' Cup Final 1989
Cup Winners' Cup Final 1989
1989
UEFA Cup Winners' Cup Finals
Cup
euro
May 1989 sports events in Europe
Sports competitions in Bern
20th century in Bern